Fitzroy Falls (postcode: 2577) is a village in the Wingecarribee Shire, located within the Southern Highlands region of New South Wales, Australia. The locality was known as Yarrunga, but was renamed after the  waterfall.

Waterfall

The waterfall was known to the indigenous Wodi Wodi people. The first European settler to see it was Charles Throsby, in the early 19th century. Near the head of the Yarrunga Creek in the Morton National Park, the waterfall was named in honour of Sir Charles Fitzroy, the Governor of New South Wales during his visit to the area in 1850.

While a town was planned for the area in the 1860s, little development occurred. With the advent of motor vehicles, Fitzroy Falls became, and still remains, a popular stopping point for tourists travelling towards the Southern Highlands. Substantial parking and catering facilities have been provided, together with pathways and boardwalks that enable able-bodied visitors to view the falls and other natural features.

Population
According to the 2021 census, there were 220 people living at Fitzroy Falls.

See also

List of waterfalls of Australia
Fitzroy Falls Reservoir

References

External links
 
 
 
 

Towns of the Southern Highlands (New South Wales)
Waterfalls of New South Wales